Kate Golden (born February 9, 1967) is an American professional golfer who played on the LPGA Tour. 

Golden played college golf at the University of Texas where she was an All-American. She graduated in 1989 with a degree in Criminal Justice. 

Golden competed on the Futures Tour in 1989 and 1990. She joined the LPGA Tour in 1992. She won once at the 2001 State Farm Classic, shooting 63 in the final round and beating Annika Sörenstam by 1 shot. After her playing days, Golden became a coach. She is now the women's assistant coach at her alma mater.

Professional wins

LPGA Tour wins (1)

References

External links

American female golfers
Texas Longhorns women's golfers
LPGA Tour golfers
Golfers from Texas
Sportspeople from Beaumont, Texas
1967 births
Living people